Flame is the thirteenth studio album by American singer Patti LaBelle. It was released by MCA Records on June 24, 1997 in the United States.

Content
Executive produced by LaBelle, Flame features songs from the likes of Jimmy Jam and Terry Lewis, who contributed to much of the compositions and productions on the album while other producers including Gerald Levert, Brenda Russell and David Foster are also featured on the album. The album features the international hit and number-one dance single, "When You Talk About Love", and the R&B radio favorite, "Shoe Was on the Other Foot". The album is also notable for including the ballad, "Don't Block the Blessings", which is the title of LaBelle's best-selling autobiography released a year before Flame.

Critical reception

Allmusic editor Leo Stanley found that Flame "is largely a slick, seductive collection of ballads punctuated by a handful of restrained dance-pop numbers. And in that sense, it's no different than any of her '90s albums, but that isn't a bad thing, since LaBelle works with top-notch, classy professionals [...] But instead of making the album sound diverse and sprawling, their highly skilled craftsmanship keeps the album unified. All that effort makes the record a pleasurable, listenable album, yet there aren't enough killer hooks or great songs to make it a standout in LaBelle's catalog. Instead, Flame is merely a good Patti LaBelle record, and sometimes that's all you need."

Larry Flick from Billboard wrote, "And the yummy singles from "Flame" just keep on coming. LaBelle effectively reinvents the Reba McEntire and Linda Davis hit as a R&B ballad. David Foster's production has ample soul, swelling from a quietly percussive opening into a grand closing that allow Miss Patti to do what she does best—belt with the power to shatter glass. With the previous "Shoe Was On The Other Foot" poised for club success, it's looking like a LaBelle-filled fall. What a joy!"

Track listing

Personnel 
 Patti LaBelle – lead vocals, backing vocals (1, 2, 5, 7-10, 14), BGV arrangements (14)
 James Wright – keyboards (1, 5, 9), backing vocals (1, 5)
 Gerald Levert – keyboard programming (2, 7), sequencing (2, 7), drums (2, 7), arrangements (2, 7)
 Edwin "Tony" Nicholas – keyboard programming (2, 7), sequencing (2, 7), drums (2, 7), arrangements (2, 7)
 David Foster – keyboards (3, 6), arrangements (3, 6)
 Simon Franglen – Synclavier programming (3, 6)
 Steve Skinner – keyboards (4, 11), synthesizers (4, 11), arrangements (4, 11), string arrangements (4, 11)
 Patrick Henderson – organ (10)
 Corey Williams – acoustic piano (10)
 Nathanial Wilkie – keyboards (12), BGV arrangements (14)
 Robbie Kondor – keyboards (13), synthesizers (13), string arrangements (13)
 Malcolm Allison – keyboards (14), programming (14), string arrangements (14)
 Lambchops – keyboards (14), programming (14), BGV arrangements (14)
 Mike Scott – guitars (1, 5, 9)
 Michael Thompson – guitars (3, 6)
 Ira Siegel – acoustic guitar (4), electric guitar (11)
 Aaron McClain	– acoustic guitar (8)
 Herb Smith – guitars (12)
 Brian "Rio" Lewis – bass (8, 10)
 Alex Richbourg – drum programming (1, 5, 9)
 Gen Rubin – drum programming (4, 11)
 Cindy Blackman – drums (10)
 Gerard Barnes – drums (12)
 Rodney Green – additional drums (14)
 Richard Rodriguez – percussion (8)
 Joe Mardin – percussion (13)
 Regina Carter – violin (4)
 Najee – saxophone (8, 10)
 Jimmy Jam and Terry Lewis – arrangerments (1, 5, 9)
 Dennis Williams – horn and string arrangements (2, 7), conductor (2, 7)
 Kathleen Thomas – string arrangements and conductor (8, 14)
 Arif Mardin – arrangements (11), string arrangements (11, 13)
 Jack Faith – orchestration (12)
 James Budd Ellison – BGV arrangements (14)
 Gene Orloff – concertmaster (4, 11, 13)
 Eboni – strings (8)
 Jamecia Bennett – backing vocals (1, 9)
 Ann Nesby – backing vocals (1)
 Sherena Wynn – backing vocals (2, 7)
 Jerry Barnes – backing vocals (4, 11)
 Katreese Barnes – backing vocals (4, 11)
 Lisa Fischer – backing vocals (4, 8, 11)
 Terry Steele – backing vocals (4)
 Sisaundra Myers – backing vocals (8)
 Lori Perry – backing vocals (8, 10)
 Kevin Ford – backing vocals (9)
 Cherrelle Norton – backing vocals (8)
 Sami McKinney – backing vocals (10)
 Curtis King – backing vocals (11)
 Debbie Henry – backing vocals (14), BGV arrangements (14)
 John Stanley – backing vocals (14), BGV arrangements (14)

Strings (Tracks 4, 11, 13 & 14)
 John Blake, Richard Hotchkiss, Richard Jones, Orest Markiah, Jennifer Morgo, Tanya Murphy, Anthony Pirollo, Melvin Roundtree and Nina Wilkenson

Strings (Track 12)
 Patricia Daniels and Marc Ward – cello
 Sophie Labiner – harp
 Nina Cottman and Ruth Wright –  viola
 Larry Abramovitz, Bonnie Ayers, Emma Kummrow, Olga Lonolpelsky, Charles Parker, Jean Perrault, Christine Reeves and Helen Wedgen – violin

Production 
 Jimmy Jam and Terry Lewis – producers (1, 5, 9)
 James "Big Jim" Wright – co-producer (1, 5, 9)
 Gerald Levert – producer (2, 7)
 Edwin "Tony" Nicholas – producer (2, 7)
 David Foster – producer (3, 6)
 Arif Mardin – producer (4, 11, 13)
 Sami McKinney – producer (8, 10)
 Christian Warren – producer (8, 10)
 James Budd Ellison – producer (12)
 Malcolm Allison – producer (14)
 Patti LaBelle – producer (14), executive producer
 Armstead Edwards – executive producer
 Barbara Ferber – production assistant 
 Pulcheria Ricks – production assistant 
 Kenny J. Gravillis – art direction, design
 Vartan – art direction, design
 Albert Sanchez – photography

Technical 
 Glenn Barratt – engineer
 Jeff Chestek – engineer
 Felipe Elgueta	– engineer
 Steve Groom – engineer
 Steve Hodge – engineer, mixing
 Richard Joseph – engineer
 Rod Milwood – engineer
 Michael O'Reilly – engineer, mixing
 Al Schmit – engineer
 Arthur Stoppe – engineer
 Mike Tarsia – engineer, mixing
 Mick Guzauski – mixing
 Ron A. Shaffer – mixing
 Brian Garten – assistant engineer
 Gordon Rice – assistant engineer
 Rick Ridpath – assistant engineer, mix assistant
 Xavier Smith – assistant engineer
 Tom Bender – mix assistant
 Hilary Bercovici – mix assistant
 Brian Gardner – mastering

Charts

Weekly charts

Year-end charts

Certifications

References

1997 albums
Patti LaBelle albums
Albums produced by David Foster
Albums produced by Arif Mardin
Albums produced by Jimmy Jam and Terry Lewis
MCA Records albums